The Chotia Woodhopper is an American ultralight aircraft that was designed by John Chotia and made available in the form of plans for amateur construction. The plans remain available from the Vintage Ultralight and Lightplane Association.

Design and development
The Woodhopper was a development of the highly successful Weedhopper, substituting wood for aluminum tubing wherever possible and simplifying the design to reduce cost. It is therefore essentially a wooden Weedhopper. It features a cable-braced high-wing, a single-seat, open cockpit, tricycle landing gear and a single engine in tractor configuration.

The aircraft is of mixed construction and is optimized for low cost and ease of building. The pilot cage, landing gear and kingpost are made from aluminum tubing, while the main fuselage keel, wings and tail surfaces are all wooden structures. The Woodhopper's flying surfaces are covered in doped aircraft fabric. Its  span wing is cable-braced from the single, tube-style kingpost and the whole airframe is liberally supported with a large number of steel cables.

The control system is two-axis and consists of a sidestick that moves longitudinally to control the elevator for pitch and laterally to actuate the rudder for yaw control. Roll is induced by yaw-roll coupling as a result of the wing's dihedral. This control system does not allow crosswind landings, but it does make learning to fly the aircraft easy and also greatly simplifies the construction of the wing, as it has no control surfaces on it. The Woodhopper can be flown on wheels and floats.

The Woodhopper was featured on the cover of Popular Mechanics in 1978, and as a result a large number of plans were sold and many aircraft were completed and flown. Construction time from the plans is estimated at 250–300 hours. Performance is determined by the engine fitted, and a wide variety of small two-stroke engines have been employed. The Woodhopper was later developed into the Gypsy.

Specifications (Woodhopper)

References

External links
 Photo of a Woodhopper

Vintage Ultralight and Lightplane Association aircraft
1970s United States ultralight aircraft
Homebuilt aircraft
Single-engined tractor aircraft